Mr Rossi (Italian: Signor Rossi) is a cartoon character created by Italian animator Bruno Bozzetto. He was first seen in several short films, about ten minutes each. The show had a life span of 15 years with 6 episodes, 3 movies and 11 skits.

In Italy, Rossi is the most common surname, suggesting to the Italian spectator that Mr. Rossi stands for the average Italian man and that he could be anyone. He also appears in a couple of feature length animations, including one where he is seen unhappy in life and single until he befriends his neighbour's talking dog Harold (Gastone in original Italian) and a Witch who grants him wishes where they have many exciting adventures. In Italy the show was known as "Il Signor Rossi cerca la felicità" whilst in English-speaking countries it was known as The Fantastic Adventures of Mr. Rossi (where it was broken down into a TV series for children's TV) or Mr. Rossi Looks for Happiness.

In the United States Mr. Rossi has become known not only as a children's film but also as a cult "druggie" film for its psychedelic coloring, jokes and mushroom references. The recent adoption of the Mr. Rossi series to the "druggie" culture is not unlike what has happened to other classic children's films.

Episodes
The Mr. Rossi short films were as follows (Original Italian titles in parenthesis):

An Award for Mr Rossi (1960) (Un Oscar per il Signor Rossi)
Mr Rossi goes Skiing (1963) (Il Signor Rossi va a sciare)
Mr Rossi on the Beach (1964) (Il Signore Rossi al mare)
Mr Rossi Buys a Car (1966) (Il Signor Rossi compra l'automobile)
Mr Rossi at Camping (1970)  (Il Signor Rossi al camping)
Mr Rossi at the Safari (1971) (Il Signor Rossi al safari fotografico)
Mr Rossi in Venice (1974) (Il Signor Rossi a Venezia)

These short films contained no spoken dialogue and any captions to accompany the film usually appeared in Italian, English, French, Spanish and German.

The feature length Mr Rossi Films include: -

Mr. Rossi Looks for Happiness (1976) (Il Signor Rossi cerca la felicità)
Mr. Rossi's Dreams (1977) (I Sogni del signor Rossi)
Mr. Rossi's Vacation (1978) (Le Vacanze del signor Rossi)

In 1975, there was a short mini series called "Mr Rossi's Sporting Feats".  It contained 11 episodes and each one was two minutes long approximately.  Each episode focused on Mr Rossi attempting to partake in one sport, with very unusual results.

These episodes featured the following: -

Rowing
Fencing
Skiing
Gymnastics
Cycling
Athletics
Basketball / Volleyball
Tennis
Swimming
Running
Football

In Bruno Bozzetto's 1976 feature-length film Allegro Non Troppo, Mr Rossi briefly appears in an animation embedded in a live-action sequence.

References

External links
Bruno Bozzeto
Jedi Paradise

Italian animated short films
Italian children's animated fantasy television series
Films directed by Bruno Bozzetto
Rossi
1960 Italian television series debuts
1978 Italian television series endings
Comics characters introduced in 1960
Rossi
Rossi